Rick Laliberte (born September 13, 1958) is a Canadian former politician. Laliberte was a Member of Parliament for the riding of Churchill River, a riding that encompasses the northern half of the province of Saskatchewan.

Laliberte was born and raised in Beauval, Saskatchewan. He is Métis and is fluent in Cree-Michif. He was elected as a New Democratic Party candidate in the 1997 federal election, but crossed the floor on September 27, 2000, to join the Liberal Party of Canada. He was re-elected as a Liberal party member in the 2000 federal election. He then left the Liberal Party prior to the 2004 election and failed to win reelection as an independent, coming in fourth behind the NDP, Liberals and the winning Conservative, Jeremy Harrison.

Electoral record

See also
 Politics of Saskatchewan

References

External links
 

1958 births
Living people
Members of the House of Commons of Canada from Saskatchewan
Liberal Party of Canada MPs
New Democratic Party MPs
Métis politicians
Indigenous Members of the House of Commons of Canada
21st-century Canadian politicians
Canadian Métis people